The 2007 Atlantic Sun men's basketball tournament was the 29th edition of the Atlantic Sun Conference (A-Sun)'s Men's Basketball Tournament. It took place from March 1–3, 2007 at the Memorial Center on the campus of East Tennessee State University in Johnson City, Tennessee. The Belmont University Bruins won the tournament, defeating the East Tennessee State University Buccaneers 94–67 in the final.

Format
The top eight eligible men's basketball teams in the Atlantic Sun Conference received a berth in the conference tournament.  After the 20-game conference season, teams are seeded by conference record.

Bracket

Asterisk denotes overtime game

Awards and honors

Tournament MVP
Justin Hare of Belmont was awarded MVP honors in the 2007 Atlantic Sun Conference tournament.

All-Tournament Team

External links
 More Tourney info at AtlanticSun.org

ASUN men's basketball tournament
Tournament
Atlantic Sun men's basketball tournament
Atlantic Sun men's basketball tournament